"Oh Yes! You're Beautiful" is a song by English glam rock singer Gary Glitter, written by Glitter with Mike Leander and produced by Mike Leander. It was released as a standalone single in the UK in 1974, and peaked at No. 2 on the UK Singles Chart. The single features the non-album track, "Thank You, Baby, for Myself" as its B-side, which was exclusive to the single.

Track listing
"Oh Yes! You're Beautiful" – 3:38
"Thank You, Baby, for Myself" – 3:35

Chart performance

Certifications

References

External links
 

1974 songs
1974 singles
Gary Glitter songs
Songs written by Mike Leander
Songs written by Gary Glitter
Song recordings produced by Mike Leander